Henry Damerel Aves (July 10, 1853—September 20, 1936)  was a missionary bishop of The Episcopal Church, serving in Mexico from his consecration in 1904. His primary ministry was to English-speaking congregations.

References

1853 births
1936 deaths
Bishops of the Episcopal Church (United States)
Anglican bishops of Mexico